Lethe dynsate, the Ceylon forester, is a butterfly in the family Nymphalidae. It is endemic to Sri Lanka.

Description
Sexes show sexual dimorphism. Male has dark brown dorsal surface, whereas female pale brown coloration. In male, dorsal surface is unmarked except few small dark eyespots. Ventral surface is heavily shaded. Tornal area possess  a series of eye spots ringed with purple. In female, dorsal surface possess creamy brown sub apical stripe on forewing. Series of large eyespots and wavy lines found on the sub marginal area of hind wing. Host plant belongs to family Poaceae such as Arundinaria debilis.

References

External links

dynsate
Butterflies described in 1863
Endemic fauna of Sri Lanka
Butterflies of Sri Lanka
Taxa named by William Chapman Hewitson